Lea Katherine Thompson (born May 31, 1961) is an American actress and director.

She is best known for her role as Lorraine Baines-McFly in the Back to the Future film trilogy (1985–1990) and  Beverly Switzler in Howard the Duck (1986). Other films for which she is known include All the Right Moves (1983), Red Dawn  (1984), Some Kind of Wonderful (1987), Dennis the Menace (1993) and The Beverly Hillbillies (1993). In the 1990s, she played the title character in the NBC sitcom Caroline in the City. From 2011 to 2017, she co-starred as Kathryn Kennish in the ABC Family-turned-Freeform series Switched at Birth.

Early life 
Thompson was born on May 31, 1961, in Rochester, Minnesota, one of five children of Clifford and Barbara Barry Thompson, a musician. She has two sisters, Coleen Goodrich and Shannon Katona, and two brothers, Andrew and Barry.

She studied ballet as a girl and danced professionally by the age of 14, winning scholarships to the San Francisco Ballet, the Pennsylvania Ballet, and the American Ballet Theatre.

When she was 20 years old and dancing professionally with American Ballet Theatre's Studio Company, then known as ABT II, the time came to decide if she would move to the main company. Mikhail Baryshnikov, who was the artistic director at the time, told her, "You're a lovely dancer, but you're too stocky." In her words, that was "my epiphany when I decided to stop dancing and not be a ballet dancer.  It was a wonderful moment because I could've been banging my head against the wall for another 10 years." She changed her focus to acting.

Moving to New York at age 20, she performed in a number of Burger King advertisements in the 1980s along with Sarah Michelle Gellar and Elisabeth Shue, her eventual co-star in Back to the Future Part II and Back to the Future Part III.

Career
 
Thompson made her home-media screen debut in 1982 as Cecily "Sissy" Loper in the interactive live-action video game MysteryDisc: Murder, Anyone? and her movie debut in 1983, with Jaws 3-D. She recalled the film as "the very first movie I ever got, but I lied and said I had done a couple of other movies, so when I showed up, I really knew absolutely nothing. Also, I had said that I knew how to water ski. And I did not. So I had, like, five days to learn really, really complicated water-skiing things, because I had to fit into the Sea World water-skiing show. I don't even know how to swim!" She followed this with All the Right Moves (1983), Red Dawn (1984), and The Wild Life (1984).

Thompson's most famous role is that of Lorraine Baines McFly in the Back to the Future trilogy, with the first film released in 1985. Thompson's character is the mother of Marty McFly (Michael J. Fox), whom Marty meets when she is a 1950s teenager after he travels back in time. He has to avoid letting Lorraine fall in love with him instead of with his future father, George (Crispin Glover), leading to awkward scenes in which Lorraine is attracted to Marty.

In 1986, Thompson starred in SpaceCamp and Howard the Duck.  For the latter film, she sang several songs on the soundtrack in character, as musician Beverly Switzler, who was the lead vocalist for a band called Cherry Bomb. The recordings appeared on the soundtrack album and on singles. Rounding out film appearances in the late 1980s, Thompson starred in Some Kind of Wonderful, Casual Sex?, and The Wizard of Loneliness. She also had a prominent role in the 1989 TV film Nightbreaker, for which she was nominated for a CableACE Award. In the early 1990s, Thompson starred as the mother of the eponymous character in Dennis the Menace (1993), the villainess in The Beverly Hillbillies (1993), and a snooty ballet instructor in The Little Rascals (1994).  She also appeared in several TV films throughout the 1990s, including The Substitute Wife (1994) and The Right To Remain Silent (1996).

Thompson found moderate critical and popular success as the star of the NBC sitcom Caroline in the City from 1995 to 1999. In 1996, Thompson received a People's Choice Award for Favorite Female Performer in a New TV Series, while her show won for Favorite New TV Comedy Series. Thompson also starred in A Will of their Own, a 1998 American television mini-series directed by Karen Arthur. The film follows six generations of females within one family, and their struggle for power and independence in America. The film debuted on October 18, 1998, on the NBC network to strong critical reviews.

After a break from acting, Thompson went on to star in several Broadway plays. She later appeared in a TV series called For the People, which only lasted one season. She then starred in a TV film, Stealing Christmas (2003), starring Tony Danza and Betty White. Thompson also appeared in several episodes of the dramedy series Ed and in a guest role for one episode in 2004 on NBC's Law & Order: Special Victims Unit; she played a woman whose embryos were stolen.
 
In 2005, Thompson began a series of made-for-TV films for the Hallmark Channel, in which she plays Jane Doe, an ex-secret agent turned housewife, who helps the government solve mysteries. Thompson directed two films from the Jane Doe series – Jane Doe: The Harder They Fall and Jane Doe: Eye of the Beholder.

Thompson was a featured singer on Celebrity Duets and the second contestant eliminated in 2006. In April 2007, she starred in another television film, A Life Interrupted, which premiered on Lifetime television.

Thompson guest-starred on the show Head Case in January 2008.  She appeared in the TV film Final Approach, which debuted in the U.S. on May 24, 2008.  Her film credits include Exit Speed,  Spy School, Splinterheads, and Adventures of a Teenage Dragon Slayer. She starred in the television movie The Christmas Clause, which received good reviews and ratings.

Thompson stars in Mystery Case Files: Shadow Lake, an adventure game released in November 2012 by Big Fish Games. Thompson's daughter Madelyn Deutch plays a paranormal television-series host.

From 2011 to 2017, Thompson starred in the ABC Family series Switched at Birth, about a family realizing their 16-year-old daughter is not biologically theirs and was switched with another baby at the hospital.

In 2014, Thompson was a competitor on the 19th season of Dancing with the Stars. She was paired with professional dancer Artem Chigvintsev. The couple was eliminated in the quarterfinals, finishing sixth place. She also played Irene Steele in the film Left Behind.

On April 27, 2017, Thompson was cast in the film Little Women, the seventh adaptation of Louisa May Alcott's novel of the same name, written and directed by first-time Director Clare Niederpruem. Thompson portrayed Marmee March, the mother who helps her daughters navigate the struggles and heartbreaks of adolescence and adulthood. The film was released on September 28, 2018, to coincide with the book's 150th-anniversary publishing date.

She directed episode 5 season 2 of the Syfy series Resident Alien, first aired in February 2022.

She directed episodes 3 and 4 as well as having a cameo role in episode 5 of season 2 of in the Paramount+ series Star Trek: Picard, which aired in March 2022.

Personal life 
She has been married to film director Howard Deutch since 1989. They met on the set of Some Kind of Wonderful (1987).

Thompson and Deutch have two daughters, both actresses: Madelyn Deutch (born 1991) and Zoey Deutch (born 1994), with whom she sang on stage in the Bye Bye Birdie production for the 16th annual Alzheimer's Association "A Night at Sardi's" in March 2008.

Filmography

Awards and nominations

See also 
 List of female film and television directors
 List of actors who have played multiple roles in the same film
 List of Dancing with the Stars competitors

References

Further reading

External links 

 
 
 
 
 
 
 

1961 births
Living people
20th-century American actresses
21st-century American actresses
Actresses from Minnesota
American ballerinas
American film actresses
American musical theatre actresses
American stage actresses
American television actresses
American television directors
American women television directors
American women television producers
American people of Irish descent
People from Rochester, Minnesota
Television producers from Minnesota